The Beaver Valley is a valley in southern Ontario, Canada, at the southern tip of Georgian Bay. The Beaver River flows north through the valley, emptying into Georgian Bay in the town of Thornbury. It is a productive agricultural area, producing a significant portion of Canada's apple crop. It also contains one of Ontario's best-preserved hardwood swamp ecosystems. The Bruce Trail follows the perimeter of the valley passing several natural landmarks including Old Baldy, the Duncan Crevice Caves, and Eugenia Falls. The main towns in the valley are Flesherton at the south end, Kimberley, and Thornbury.

Geology

The Beaver Valley formed over a period of many thousands of years as the Beaver River cut into the Niagara Escarpment. Today, the river continues to cut southward into the bedrock at Eugenia Falls. Gradual erosive processes have created a wedge-shaped valley with a width ranging from 30 meters (90 feet) at the south end to 13 kilometers (8 miles) at the north end.

Ecology

While much of the valley is heavily cultivated, it also contains several well-preserved natural habitats and is home to a number of locally and globally rare species, notably American Hart's-tongue fern (Asplenium scolopendrium var. americanum).

Recreation

The valley is well known for skiing and snowboarding in the winter. Beaver Valley Ski Club operates as a private ski club just south of the town of Kimberley. A location known as Old Smokey was a ski area in the valley that closed in the early 1980s. Another resort, Talisman, was opened in 1963 and closed in 2011, approximately 4 million dollars in debt. When the resort was operating, it included a 9-hole golf course and a ski hill with 3 chairlifts and a T-bar.

References

External links

River valleys of Canada
Ski areas and resorts in Canada
Grey County